Lucien Fontanarosa (19 December 1912 – 27 April 1975) was a French painter. His work was part of the painting event in the art competition at the 1948 Summer Olympics.

References

1912 births
1975 deaths
20th-century French painters
20th-century French male artists
French male painters
Olympic competitors in art competitions
Painters from Paris